Outcome Health is a Chicago-based healthcare technology company founded by Rishi Shah. Its registered name is ContextMedia Health LLC. It is majority owned by Littlejohn & Co., a private equity firm. After its founders were indicted by a federal grand jury on multiple charges of fraud and also sued by the SEC, veteran tech investor Howard A. Tullman called Outcome "our version of Theranos."

History
In May 2017, a funding round with Goldman Sachs, CapitalG, Pritzker Group, and others invested $600 million in Outcome Health, giving it a $5.6 billion valuation. This is the largest single funding round in Chicago since Groupon in 2011, when it raised $950 million in its fifth funding round.

According to a report in The Wall Street Journal unnamed former employees and advertisers accused the company of overcharging their customers for advertisements and misquoting third-party analyses and falsifying documents on the ads' performance. According to the accusations, Outcome Health reported that the ads appeared on more video screens than they had installed. Lanny Davis, a company spokesperson, responded by saying a law firm had been hired to "review allegations about certain employees' conduct that have been raised internally."

In November 2017, CEO Vivek Kundra left the company. Also in November, several advertisers stopped working with Outcome Health and investors sued the company claiming fraud and breach of contract.

As of January 2018, Outcome Health decided to settle outstanding investor lawsuits in exchange for having Shah and Agarwal step down.

In June 2018, Matt McNally, former chief media officer at Publicis Health, was announced as the company's new CEO.

On November 25, 2019, four former executives were indicted for falsifying ad performance statements to secure bank loans of nearly $1 Billion. Additionally, former CEO Rishi Shah and former President Shradha Agarwal were charged with mail, wire and bank fraud. Shah and Agarwal face up to 30 years in prison if convicted of the most serious charges.

References

External links

Health care companies based in Illinois
Companies with year of establishment missing
Private equity portfolio companies
Companies based in Chicago